Agustín Medina (born 11 July 1999) is an Argentine professional footballer who plays as a forward for Defensores Unidos.

Career
Medina is a product of the youth system of Defensores Unidos. He made the breakthrough into the Primera B Metropolitana club's first-team squad towards the end of 2018–19, appearing for his professional debut on 28 April 2019 during a 1–1 draw at home to Deportivo Español; replacing Jesús Portillo for the final moments.

Career statistics
.

References

External links

1999 births
Living people
Place of birth missing (living people)
Argentine footballers
Association football forwards
Primera B Metropolitana players
Defensores Unidos footballers